Grandgourt railway station was a railway station in the municipality of Basse-Allaine, in the Swiss canton of Jura. It is an intermediate stop on the standard gauge Delémont–Delle line of Swiss Federal Railways. The station closed with the December 2022 timetable change.

References

External links 
 

Railway stations in the canton of Jura
Swiss Federal Railways stations